Chicago Lions SC was an American Soccer Club based in Chicago Illinois. The club was operated by the (Ukrainian American Sports Association). The club competed professionally in the Lamar Hunt US Open Cup (National Challenge Cup) and the National Soccer League (Chicago). They were also known as the Ukrainian Lions. All their home games were played at Hansen Stadium in Chicago Illinois. The club was founded in 1949 by Ukrainian immigrants who settled in the Chicago area after WW 2. There were 6 Lions players that played on the US Men's National Team Nick Krat, Orest Banach, Willy Roy, Mike Noha and Stefan Szefer and Fred Kovacs. In 1975 the Chicago Sting signed Chicago Lions players Willy Roy, Ian Stone, Stefan Szefer, Mike Winter, Richard Green and Eugene Andruss for there inaugural season in the North American Soccer League. Other players that went on to play in the North American Soccer League and the American Soccer League were Nick Owcharuk with the San Diego Sockers, Leo Kulinczenko with the Los Angeles Skyhawks, Bill Mishalow with the Memphis Rogues.

Honours 

National Soccer League (Chicago) Champion: 4
 1952-53,1970-71,1971-72,1973-74

Peel Cup: 1
1956

Illinois Governors Cup: 3
1972,1974,1977

Notable former players
  Orest Banach
  Nick Krat
  Willy Roy
  Mike Noha

Former players
 Ian Stone 1968-1976
 Fred Kovacs 1974-1976
 Stefan Szefer 1973-1974
 Leo Kulinczenko 1974-1976
 Bill Mishalow 1970-1974
 Nick Owcharuk 1970-1974
 Paul Keenan 1980-1983
 Terry Gallager 1980-1983
 Nick Woznij 1972-1976
 Richard Green 1974-1975
 Mike Winter 1974-1975
 William Drozd 1980-1982
 Eugene Mishalow 1972-1976
 Christian Kipka 1974-1976
 Nick Iwanik 1968-1976
  Nick Krat 1968-1976
  Mike Noha 1968-1970
 Manuel Medina 1964-1973
 George Perry 1970-1974
 Jerry Leciuk  1972-1976
 John Gusella 1970-1976
 Leo Schorohod 1968-1976
 Eugene Andruss 1973-1976
 Nick Shlapak 1974-1975
 Andrew Cozij 1968-1974
 Anatoly Jaworskyj 1966-1973
 Raymond Roy 1974-1977
 Bozo Banovic 1975-1976
 Ilia Pavljasevic 1975-1976
 Andrew Babek 1964-1970
 Eddie Paoli 1974-1980

Former Managers

 Anatoly Hordinskyj 1970-1986
 Vadim Mishalow 1974-1981
 Orest Klufas 1960-1970

References

Soccer clubs in Chicago